Bonfires and Broomsticks is a 1947 children's book by Mary Norton. Parts of the book were adapted into the 1971 Disney movie Bedknobs and Broomsticks.

Synopsis
Two years after the events of The Magic Bedknob, Carey, Charles, and Paul convince their mother to let them stay with Miss Price again. Using the bed knob, they travel back in time to the reign of Charles II, where they meet a friendly necromancer called Emilius and bring him back with them.

Omnibus
The book and its 1944 predecessor were combined into the omnibus Bedknob and Broomstick in 1957, illustrated by Erik Blegvad.

References

1947 children's books
1947 British novels
1947 fantasy novels
British children's novels
British novels adapted into films
Fiction about alchemy
Fiction set in 1942
1947 debut novels
Children's fantasy novels
Novels about time travel
J. M. Dent books